Chogha Horushi (also Romanized as Choghā Horūshī, Chaqā Hūroshī, and Chakāhu Rusi) is a village in Koregah-e Gharbi Rural District, in the Central District of Khorramabad County, Lorestan Province, Iran. At the 2006 census, its population was 132, in 24 families.

References 

Towns and villages in Khorramabad County